Skitmang is a village in the Leh district of the Indian union territory of Ladakh. It is located in the Leh tehsil.

Demographics
According to the 2011 census of India, Skitmang has 37 households. The effective literacy rate (i.e. the literacy rate of population excluding children aged 6 and below) is 62.15%.

References

Villages in Nyoma tehsil